Lanjanist is a village in the Vedi Municipality of the Ararat Province of Armenia.

References 
 (as Kadrlu)

Populated places in Ararat Province